Petros V may refer to:

 Patriarch Peter V of Alexandria  (7th–8th centuries)
 Gregory Petros V Kupelian, Armenian Catholic Patriarch of Cilicia in 1788–1812